Laelaa is a 2011 Maldivian romantic drama film produced and directed by Hamid Ali. Produced under Learner's Production, the film stars Yoosuf Shafeeu, Amira Ismail, Hamid Ali, Hassan Manik and Ahmed Easa in pivotal roles. The film was released on 29 September 2018.

Cast 
 Yoosuf Shafeeu as Ziyad
 Hamid Ali as Ahammaa
 Roanu Hassan Manik
 Koyya Hassan Manik
 Amira Ismail as Laela
 Ahmed Easa as Shivan
 Fathimath Azifa as Neena
 Arifa Ibrahim
 Neena Saleem
 Niuma Mohamed in the item number (Special appearance)

Soundtrack

Release and response
The film was released on 29 September 2011. Upon release the film received negative response from critics. Ahmed Nadheem from Haveeru Daily was satisfies with the morale of the story while blaming the weak screenplay for the "fragile film". "Laela is too slow and dragged, some scenes get too lengthy leaving the audience yawning at boredom. The story is predictable and lacks reality".

References

2011 films
Maldivian romantic drama films
2011 romantic drama films
Dhivehi-language films